Gorodetsk is a rural locality (a village) in Surskoye Rural Settlement of Pinezhsky District, Arkhangelsk Oblast, Russia. The population was 313 as of 2010. There are 6 streets.

Geography 
Gorodetsk is located on the Mysovaya River, 93 km southeast of Karpogory (the district's administrative centre) by road. Ostrov is the nearest rural locality.

References 

Rural localities in Pinezhsky District